Rocky Springs is a ghost town in Angelina County, in the U.S. state of Texas. It is located within the Lufkin, Texas micropolitan area.

History
Rocky Springs had several houses in the late 1930s. Many residents left the area, but a church and cemetery were in the community as late as the 1980s. Its cemetery was shown on maps in 2000.

Geography

Education
Rocky Springs had its school in the 1930s. Today, the ghost town is located within the Huntington Independent School District.

See also
List of ghost towns in Texas

References

Geography of Angelina County, Texas
Ghost towns in East Texas